LPM Pallavolo Mondovì is an Italian women's volleyball club based in Mondovì and currently playing in the Serie A2.

Previous names
Due to sponsorship, the club have competed under the following names:
 Pallavolo Mondovì (....–2004)
 LPM Pallavolo Mondovì (2004–2016)
 LPM Bam Mondovì (2016–present)

History
 was established in the 1980s when it acquired the rights of A.S. Piazza and took over the women's volleyball department of Acli Unione Sportiva Altipiano. It started competing in regional competitions before playing the Serie D and Serie C. In 2004, it was renamed  and started a restructure process. Promotion to Serie B2 was achieved in 2008 with the club winning the title (and promotion to Serie B1) in the 2013–14 season. The club was promoted to Serie A2 in 2016. Despite being relegated to Serie B1 after finishing 13th in the 2016–17 Serie A2, the club requested to be on a waiting list for the Serie A2 in the following season. On 31 July 2017, the club was confirmed as a participant of the Serie A2 for the 2017–18 season.

Team
Season 2017–2018, as of September 2017.

References

External links
 Official website 

Italian women's volleyball clubs
Sport in Piedmont